Klaus Grogorenz (born 27 April 1937) is a German athlete. He competed in the men's decathlon at the 1960 Summer Olympics.

References

1937 births
Living people
Athletes (track and field) at the 1960 Summer Olympics
German decathletes
Olympic athletes of the United Team of Germany
Sportspeople from Saxony-Anhalt